Princess Sophie Amalie of Nassau-Siegen (10 January 1650Jul. – 15/25 November 1688), official titles: Prinzessin von Nassau, Gräfin zu Katzenelnbogen, Vianden, Diez, Limburg und Bronkhorst, Frau zu Beilstein, Stirum, Wisch, Borculo, Lichtenvoorde und Wildenborch, Erbbannerfrau des Herzogtums Geldern und der Grafschaft Zutphen, was a countess from the House of Nassau-Siegen, a cadet branch of the Ottonian Line of the House of Nassau. In 1664, she was elevated to the rank and title of princess. By marriage she became Duchess Consort of Courland.

Biography

Sophie Amalie was named after her godmother, the Danish-Norwegian Queen Sophie Amalie. In October and November 1652 she first lost her eldest sister Ernestine and then her father Henry. After the death of the father, Sophie Amalie’s brothers William Maurice and Frederick Henry were adopted by their uncle Fürst John Maurice of Nassau-Siegen. Together with Sophie Amalie, both brothers were elevated into the Reichsfürstenstand on 6 May 1664.

Sophie Amalie married in The Hague on 5 October 1675Greg. to Hereditary Prince Frederick Casimir of Courland (6 July 1650 – 22 January 1698). In 1682, after the death of her father-in-law, Sophie Amalie became Duchess Consort of Courland.

Sophia Amalia died in childbirth in Mitau on 15/25 November 1688 and was buried in the Reformed Church in Mitau on 16/26 December.

Issue
From the marriage of Sophie Amalie and Frederick Casimir the following children were born:
 Frederick Kettler (3 April 1682 – 11 February 1683), Hereditary Prince of Courland.
 Marie Dorothea Kettler (2 August 1684 – 17 January 1743), married to Margrave Albert Frederick of Brandenburg-Schwedt.
 Eleonore Charlotte Kettler (11 June 1686 – 28 July 1748), married to Duke Ernest Ferdinand of Brunswick-Wolfenbüttel-Bevern.
 Christina Sophia Kettler (15 November 1688 – 22 April 1694).

Ancestors

Notes

References

Sources
 
 
 
 
 
 
 
 
 
 
 
 
 
  (1882). Het vorstenhuis Oranje-Nassau. Van de vroegste tijden tot heden (in Dutch). Leiden: A.W. Sijthoff/Utrecht: J.L. Beijers.

External links

 Baltic States. In: Medieval Lands. A prosopography of medieval European noble and royal families, compiled by Charles Cawley.
 Nassau. In: Medieval Lands. A prosopography of medieval European noble and royal families, compiled by Charles Cawley.
 Nassau Part 5. In: An Online Gotha, by Paul Theroff.

|-

1650 births
1688 deaths
17th-century German women
17th-century Latvian people
Burials in the Ducal Crypt of the Jelgava Palace
Duchesses of Courland
German Calvinist and Reformed Christians
Sophie Amalie of Nassau-Siegen
Sophie Amalie of Nassau-Siegen